William the Rich may refer to:
 William I, Count of Nassau-Siegen (1487–1559)
 William, Duke of Jülich-Cleves-Berg (1516–1592)
 William Jennens (1701–1798) William the Miser, William the Rich, 'the richest commoner in England' who died intestate. The legal case dragged on for over 100 years.